Sarah A. "Sally" Oppenheim-Barnes, Baroness Oppenheim-Barnes, PC (née Viner; born 26 July 1928) is a British Conservative politician.

Early life 
Born in Dublin in 1928, Viner was raised and educated in Sheffield, where her father founded a steel and cutlery company. She attended Lowther College and worked as a social worker in London before entering politics.

Career 
At the 1970 general election, she defeated Jack Diamond to represent the constituency of Gloucester; Diamond was the only cabinet minister to lose his seat at that election. She continued as Member of Parliament for Gloucester until 1987 and was Minister of State for Consumer Affairs in the Department of Trade between 1979 and 1982.

Oppenheim-Barnes was created a life peer, as Baroness Oppenheim-Barnes of Gloucester in the County of Gloucestershire, on 9 February 1989. Her son Phillip Oppenheim is a former Conservative MP for Amber Valley. Between 1983 and 1987 mother and son served simultaneously in the House of Commons. On 25 February 2019 she retired from the House of Lords under the House of Lords Reform Act 2014.

References

External links
 
 Women's Rights: Radical Change – video of Oppenheim appearing in a BBC debate first televised in 1974

1928 births
Living people
Conservative Party (UK) MPs for English constituencies
Life peeresses created by Elizabeth II
Conservative Party (UK) life peers
Female members of the Parliament of the United Kingdom for English constituencies
Irish emigrants to the United Kingdom
Irish Jews
UK MPs 1970–1974
UK MPs 1974
UK MPs 1974–1979
UK MPs 1979–1983
UK MPs 1983–1987
Members of Parliament for Gloucester
Members of the Privy Council of the United Kingdom
Jewish British politicians
People educated at Lowther College
Politicians from Sheffield
Politicians from Dublin (city)
20th-century British women politicians
20th-century English women
20th-century English people